The Centre Left Alliance (Romanian: Alianţa de Centru Stânga, ACS) was a political alliance between the Social Democratic Party (PSD) and the National Union for the Progress of Romania (UNPR) founded in August 2012.

The alliance was part of the Social Liberal Union (USL) together with the Conservative Party (PC) and the National Liberal Party (PNL), the latter two part of the no longer functioning ACD. PSD and UNPR had common parliamentary groups and at one point planned a merger.

Electoral history

Legislative elections 

Notes:

1 USL was an alliance of two smaller alliances: Centre Left Alliance (ACS) and Centre Right Alliance (ACD). Centre Left Alliance (ACS) members: PSD (58 senators and 149 deputies) and UNPR (5 senators and 10 deputies). The Centre Right Alliance (ACD) members were the PNL (51 senators and 101 deputies) and the PC (8 senators and 13 deputies).

2 ALDE was created in June 2015 from a merger of PLR (a splinter of PNL) and PC.

References 

Defunct political party alliances in Romania